Nan gyi thoke (also spelled nangyi thoke or nangyi dok) is an a thoke salad dish in Burmese cuisine, made with thick round rice noodles mixed with specially prepared chicken curry and chili oil. The dish is garnished with toasted chickpea flour, sliced onions, chilis, crispy noodles, slices of hard-boiled egg, fish cakes, and zested with lime or lemon. The noodle salad originated as a street food from Mandalay.

Etymology
The salad is known by a number of different terms, including nan gyi thoke, nan gyi mont di, and is called Mandalay mont di in Yangon. Nan gyi (နန်းကြီး) refers to the thick round rice noodles used in this salad.

See also 
 Burmese cuisine
 List of salads
 Meeshay 
 Ohn no khao swe
 Mont di

References

External links
 Nan gyi thoke - Burmese Noodles recipe

Burmese cuisine
Noodle salads